Gersemi (Old Norse "treasure") is the daughter of the fertility-goddess Freyja in Norse mythology. She could be the same figure as Hnoss, another daughter of Freyja.

Name 
The Old Norse name Gersemi means 'treasure', something which is considered precious or valuable. It is most likely a derivative of the unattested Old Norse noun *gersamr, compared with the Icelandic gersemi or the Old Swedish gärsimi ('treasure'), and with the Danish gjørsum (a special fine imposed on a manslaughterer).

References

Bibliography

Vanir
Norse goddesses
Freyja